The John W. Coffren House and Store are two historic buildings located at Croom in Prince George's County, Maryland.  This assemblage is significant for their architecture, as well as their association with the commercial history of the area and with John W. Coffren, local merchant and landowner. The Coffren House, built in 1861, has a Greek Revival entrance and interior detail. The Coffren Store, constructed ca. 1853, is a utilitarian structure, designed for use as a one-room general store.  The store closed in 1945. The significance of the house and store together is that they are an intact example of house and store complexes that served rural communities in the county during the 19th century. Their builder, John W. Coffren (1828-1874), who rose from ditch digger to wealthy merchant, served on the Vestry of St. Thomas Church in Croom and on the Prince George's County School Board, as well as owning much of the property in the Village of Croom.

The complex was listed on the National Register of Historic Places in 1987.

References

External links
, including photo in 1986, at Maryland Historical Trust website

Houses completed in 1861
Commercial buildings completed in 1853
Houses in Prince George's County, Maryland
Houses on the National Register of Historic Places in Maryland
Commercial buildings on the National Register of Historic Places in Maryland
Historic American Buildings Survey in Maryland
1853 establishments in Maryland
National Register of Historic Places in Prince George's County, Maryland